Dr. John Cattanach (1885–1915) was a shinty player for Newtonmore in the 1900s.  He is the only shinty player inducted into the Scottish Sports Hall of Fame

Biography

Cattanach is considered one the outstanding shinty players in history. He scored eight goals in an 11 – 3 victory for Newtonmore over Furnace in the Camanachd Cup Final of 1909, this record still stands. Cattanach was also capped for his country at hockey and athletics. He was also a qualified medic, graduating from the University of Edinburgh in 1912. Cattanach served in the Royal Army Medical Corps, Warwickshire Regiment, becoming a Lieutenant in 1914. He died in 1915 during the First World War at Gallipoli.

He was posthumously inducted into the Scottish Sports Hall of Fame in 2002, and remains the only shinty player to have received this honour.

References

External links
Biography of Dr. John Cattanach
Cattanach's entry in the SSHF

1885 births
1915 deaths
Shinty players
20th-century Scottish medical doctors
British Army personnel of World War I
British military personnel killed in World War I
Royal Army Medical Corps officers
Badenoch and Strathspey